Jānis Pujats (born 14 November 1930) is the archbishop emeritus of Riga, Latvia, and a cardinal.

Biography
Pujats was born in Nautrēni parish in Latgale. He attended the Theological Seminary in Riga until it was closed by the Soviet Union in 1951. Two months later, he was ordained in a secret ceremony by Archbishop Antonijs Springovičs. During the pontificate of Pope Paul VI, he implemented the Pope's liturgical reform and published the first missal in Latvian. 

Pujats was made Archbishop of Riga in 1991. On 21 February 1998, he was made a cardinal in pectore by Pope John Paul II, a fact made public at the consistory of 21 February 2001. He was one of the cardinal electors who participated in the 2005 papal conclave that elected Pope Benedict XVI. 

He speaks Russian, Polish, Lithuanian, German and Latin, in addition to his native Latvian. He was the only member of the Synod of Bishops to address the assembly exclusively Latin at the 2001 and 2005 meetings. Pope Benedict accepted his resignation on 19 June 2010 and appointed Zbigņevs Stankevičs to succeed him in Riga.

Views

Condemnation of homosexuality
In a May 2007 open letter protesting a gay pride march scheduled for 3 June 2007 as part of the Riga Pride and Friendship Days, Pujāts referred to homosexuality as "absolute depravity in sexual behavior" and an "unnatural form of prostitution". He told the faithful to "be prepared to go out into the streets" to protest the events, "not to create disorder, but to offer a disciplined position in support of the government, because on this very important issue of morals, the government is on the side of Christians."

Declaration of Truths
On 10 June 2019, Pujats, Cardinal Raymond Leo Burke, and Kazakh bishops Tomasz Peta, Jan Paul Lenga, and Athanasius Schneider published a 40-point "Declaration of Truths" claiming to reaffirm traditional Church teaching. The bishops wrote that such a declaration was necessary in a time of "almost universal doctrinal confusion and disorientation." Specific passages in the declaration implicitly relate to several writings by Pope Francis. The declaration states that "the religion born of faith in Jesus Christ" is the "only religion positively willed by God," seemingly alluding to the Document on Human Fraternity signed by Pope Francis on 4 February, which stated that the "diversity of religions" is "willed by God." Following recent changes to the Catechism to oppose capital punishment, the declaration states that the Church "did not err" in teaching that civil authorities may "lawfully exercise capital punishment" when it is "truly necessary" and to preserve the "just order of societies."

See also
 Roman Catholic Church of Latvia

References

External links
 
 Catholic Hierarchy
 Metropolitan Archdiocese of Riga
 The Cardinals of the Holy Roman Church

1930 births
Living people
Latvian cardinals
Latvian Roman Catholic archbishops
Archbishops of Riga
20th-century Roman Catholic archbishops in Latvia
21st-century Roman Catholic archbishops in Latvia
Cardinals created by Pope John Paul II
People from Rēzekne Municipality